, also known as , was a Japanese ethnologist, linguist, folklorist, novelist, and poet. As a disciple of Kunio Yanagita, he established an original academic field named , which is a mixture of Japanese folklore, Japanese classics, and Shintō. He produced many works in a diversity of fields covering the history of literature, folkloric performing arts, folklore itself, Japanese language, the classics study, Shintōology, ancient study, and so on. Yukio Mishima once called him the "Japanese Walter Pater".

Biography
Orikuchi was born in the former Nishinari, Ōsaka (now part of Naniwa-ku, Osaka). After graduating with a degree in Japanese literature from Kokugakuin University in 1910, he started to teach Japanese and Chinese classics at junior high schools. In 1919, he was employed as a part-time instructor in Kokugakuin University. In 1922, he was promoted to professor. In 1924, he was hired as a professor at Keio University as well; afterward, he taught at two different universities until he died. As a poet, he and Kitahara Hakushu established a tanka magazine called Nikkō ("Sunshine") in 1924. In 1925, he published , his first tanka book, which is highly esteemed.

In 1934, he received a doctorate for his study on the Man'yōshū. As a folklorist, Yanagita was known for rejecting every sexual subject; Orikuchi, in contrast, was very open-minded to these matters. He became a model for the protagonist in Mishima's short story , while his novel Shisha no Sho was the basis for a film by Kihachiro Kawamoto.

Major works
 – Tanka book
 – Tanka book
 – Novel, translated into English in 2016 by Jeffrey Angles
 – Treatise on folklore and literature in ancient Japan
 – Kabuki review

See also
 Kishu ryūritan

Sources

 加藤守雄『わが師折口信夫』朝日新聞社(1967) 
 諏訪春雄『折口信夫を読み直す』講談社現代新書(1994)
 山折哲雄、穂積生萩『執深くあれ 折口信夫のエロス』小学館(1997)
 富岡多恵子『釈迢空ノート』岩波書店(2000)
 安藤礼二『神々の闘争 折口信夫論』講談社(2004)

External links 

Orikuchi Shinobu in the Encyclopedia of Shinto.

References

1887 births
1953 deaths
Japanese ethnologists
Japanese folklorists
Linguists from Japan
20th-century Japanese novelists
Kokugaku scholars
People from Osaka
Academic staff of Keio University
Japanese gay writers
Japanese LGBT poets
Japanese LGBT novelists
Gay poets
Gay novelists
Gay academics
Religion academics
20th-century Japanese poets
20th-century linguists
Japanese fantasy writers